Oxbow Lake is a  is a naturally-occurring lake located in the towns of Lake Pleasant and Arietta in Hamilton County, New York within the Adirondack Park. The lake has  of shoreline and no islands. NY Route 8 is located along the southeast shoreline, Oxbow Road crosses the lake inlet on the northeastern end, and Old Piseco Road (County Rt. 24) crosses the lake outlet on the southwestern end.

The southeastern shoreline of the lake is lined with seasonal and some year-round residences. The remainder of the lake shore is generally undeveloped given the existence of extensive wetlands along the northeastern and southwestern ends and the fact that the entire northwestern shoreline is located within the Jessup River Wild Forest.

The lake is a warm-water fishery given its relatively shallow depth. It is recognized as being a top fishing water for both Largemouth Bass and Pickerel.

References

Lakes of Hamilton County, New York
Lakes of New York (state)